Donatas Zavackas (born 23 April 1980) is a Lithuanian former professional basketball player. He played college basketball at University of Pittsburgh.

College career
During his successful career at Pitt, Zavackas was known as one of the most intelligent, hardworking team players in the Big East Conference.  Zavackas was a key component in Head Coach Ben Howland's transformation of the Panthers into a level of league elite status.  The season before Zavackas arrived, Pitt finished the Big East season in 11th place with a 5–13 record (14–16 overall).  During Zavackas' four years the Panthers captured two regular season Big East Titles, played in three Big East tournament (BET) Championship games and captured one BET Championship.  Pitt also played in one National Invitation Tournament and two NCAA Tournaments (advancing to the Sweet 16 round both times) with Zavackas at power forward position.

Zavackas scored 1,099 points for the Panthers which currently places him 31st on Pitt's All Time scoring list.  His .807 free throw percentage is good enough for 5th place in Panther history.

Unfortunately, many Pittsburgh fans only remember Zavackas for removing his shoes and refusing to play in the waning minutes of an NCAA Tournament game.  That game, versus Marquette, would be his last career college game.

Professional career
After winning third place in the Lithuanian League (LKL) with Šiauliai, he moved to Lietuvos Rytas, where he became the LKL champion in 2009. In this club he gained reputation of overly emotional player.

In August 2010, he signed a one-year contract with the German club EnBW Ludwigsburg. In June 2011, he extended his contract with Ludwigsburg for one more season. In February, 2012 he moved to BK VEF Rīga, signing a two-year contract with a team.

On September 2, 2013, he signed a one-month contract with the EuroLeague powerhouse CSKA Moscow, to work with the team during preseason period. Later that month he moved to the German team Telekom Baskets Bonn. On December 30, 2013, he signed with the Italian team Vanoli Cremona for the remainder of the season.

In August 2014, he signed a two-year deal with his former team Neptūnas Klaipėda.

On August 16, 2016, Zavackas signed with Consultinvest Pesaro of the Italian Serie A.
On October 9, 2017, Zavackas retired and became the sports director of Neptūnas Klaipėda.

EuroLeague career statistics

|-
| style="text-align:left;"| 2009–10
| style="text-align:left;"| Lietuvos Rytas
| 10 || 9 || 24.9 || .379 || .400 || .826 || 3.1 || 1.1 || .9 || .2 || 7.9 || 6.7
|-
| style="text-align:left;"| 2014–15
| style="text-align:left;"| Neptūnas
| 10 || 9 || 25.9 || .594 || .571 || .750 || 5.1 || 1.8 || .7 || .0 || 12.0 || 13.7
|- class="sortbottom"
| style="text-align:left;"| Career
| style="text-align:left;"|
| 20 || 18 || 25.4 || .496 || .480 || .788 || 4.1 || 1.5 || .8 || .1 || 10.0 || 10.2

References

External links
 Donatas Zavackas at euroleague.net
 Donatas Zavackas at FIBA.com
 Donatas Zavackas  at pittsburghpanthers.com

1980 births
Living people
BC Dnipro players
BC Neptūnas players
BC Rytas players
BC Šiauliai players
Besançon BCD players
BK VEF Rīga players
Bree BBC players
KK Włocławek players
Lega Basket Serie A players
Liège Basket players
Lithuanian men's basketball players
Lithuanian expatriate basketball people in Poland
Lithuanian expatriate basketball people in Ukraine
Lithuanian expatriate basketball people in Latvia
Lithuanian expatriate basketball people in Germany
Lithuanian expatriate basketball people in the United States
Riesen Ludwigsburg players
Pallalcesto Amatori Udine players
Pittsburgh Panthers men's basketball players
Power forwards (basketball)
Basketball players from Klaipėda
Telekom Baskets Bonn players
Vanoli Cremona players
Victoria Libertas Pallacanestro players
St. Vincent–St. Mary High School alumni